Mojtaba Mamashli (born October 14, 1988) is an Iranian football midfielder who plays for Nassaji Mazandaran in Iran Pro League.

Career

Club career statistics

References

 

1989 births
Living people
Iranian footballers
Association football defenders
Association football wingers
Nassaji Mazandaran players